Nosferatu the Vampyre is a 1979 horror film written and directed by Werner Herzog. It is set primarily in 19th-century Wismar, Germany and Transylvania, and was conceived as a stylistic remake of F. W. Murnau's 1922 German Dracula adaptation Nosferatu. The picture stars Klaus Kinski as Count Dracula, Isabelle Adjani as Lucy Harker, Bruno Ganz as Jonathan Harker, and French artist-writer Roland Topor as Renfield. There are two different versions of the film, one in which the actors speak English, and one in which they speak German.

Herzog's production of Nosferatu was very well received by critics and enjoyed a comfortable degree of commercial success. The film also marks the second of five collaborations between director Herzog and actor Kinski, immediately followed by 1979's Woyzeck. The film had 1,000,000 admissions in West Germany and grossed ITL 53,870,000 in Italy. It was also a modest success in Adjani's home country, taking in 933,533 admissions in France.

A novelization of the screenplay was written by Paul Monette and published by both Avon Publishing and Picador in 1979. The 1988 Italian horror film Nosferatu in Venice is a "sequel-in-name-only", again featuring Kinski in the title role.

Plot
Jonathan Harker is an estate agent in Wismar, Germany. His employer, Renfield, informs him that a nobleman named Count Dracula wishes to buy a property in Wismar and assigns Harker to visit the Count and complete the lucrative deal. Leaving his young wife Lucy behind in Wismar, Harker travels to Transylvania, to Count Dracula's castle, in a journey that lasts four weeks, carrying with him the deeds and documents needed to sell the house to the Count. On his trip, Harker stops at a village inn, where the locals plead for him to stay away from the accursed castle, providing him with details of Dracula's vampirism. Ignoring the villagers' pleas as superstition, Harker continues his journey, ascending the Borgo Pass on foot and eventually arriving at Dracula's castle, where he meets the Count, a strange, almost rodent-like man, with large ears, pale skin, sharp teeth, and long fingernails.

The Count is enchanted by a small portrait of Lucy and immediately agrees to purchase the Wismar property, especially with the knowledge that he and Lucy would become neighbors. As Jonathan's visit progresses, he is haunted at night by several dream-like encounters with the vampiric Count. Simultaneously, in Wismar, Lucy is tormented by night terrors, plagued by images of impending doom. Additionally, Renfield is committed to an asylum after biting a cow, apparently having gone completely insane. To Harker's horror, he finds the Count asleep in a coffin, confirming for him that Dracula is indeed a vampire. That night, Dracula leaves for Wismar, taking several coffins filled with the cursed earth that he needs for his vampiric rest. Harker finds that he is imprisoned in the castle and attempts to escape through a window via a makeshift rope fashioned from bedsheets. The rope is not long enough, and Jonathan falls, severely injuring himself. The next morning, he awakes on the ground, stirred by the sound of a young Romani boy playing the violin. He is eventually sent to a hospital and raves about 'black coffins' to doctors, who assume that the illness affects his mind.

Meanwhile, Dracula and his coffins travel to Wismar by ship via the Black Sea port of Varna, thence through the Bosphorus and the Strait of Gibraltar and around the entire west European Atlantic coast to the Baltic Sea. He systematically kills the whole crew, making it appear as if they were afflicted with the plague. The ghost ship arrives, with its cargo, at Wismar, where doctors – including Abraham Van Helsing – investigate the strange fate of the vessel. They discover a ship's log that mentions their perceived affliction with the plague. Wismar is then flooded with rats from the ship. Dracula arrives in Wismar with his coffins, and death spreads rapidly throughout the town. The desperately ill Jonathan is finally transported home, but he does not appear to recognize his wife when he finally arrives. Lucy later encounters Count Dracula; weary and unable to die, he demands some of the love that she gave so freely to Jonathan, but she refuses, much to Dracula's dismay. Now aware that something other than plague is responsible for the death that has beset her once-peaceful town, Lucy desperately tries to convince the townspeople, but they are skeptical and uninterested. From a book given to Jonathan by the people in Transylvania, she finds that she can defeat Dracula's evil by distracting him until dawn, at which time the rays of the sun will destroy him, but only at the cost of her own life. That night, she lures the Count to her bedroom, where he proceeds to drink her blood.

Lucy's beauty and purity distract Dracula from the call of the rooster, and at the first light of day, he collapses to the floor, dead. Van Helsing arrives to discover Lucy dead but victorious. He then drives a stake through the heart of the Count to make sure that Lucy's sacrifice was not in vain. In a final ironic twist, Jonathan awakens from his sickness, now a vampire, and has Van Helsing arrested for the murder of Count Dracula. He then states enigmatically that he has much to do and is last seen riding away on horseback, garbed in the same fluttering black as Dracula.

Cast
 Klaus Kinski as Count Dracula
 Isabelle Adjani as Lucy Harker
 Bruno Ganz as Jonathan Harker
 Roland Topor as Renfield
 Walter Ladengast as Dr Abraham van Helsing
 Dan van Husen as Warden
 Jan Groth as Harbormaster
 Carsten Bodinus as Schrader
 Martje Grohmann as Mina
 Rijk de Gooyer as Town official
 Clemens Scheitz as Clerk
 John Leddy as Coachman
 Tim Beekman as Coffin bearer
 Lo van Hensbergen
 Margiet van Hartingsveld

Production

Background
While the basic story is derived from Bram Stoker's novel Dracula, director Herzog made the 1979 film primarily as an homage remake of F. W. Murnau's  silent film Nosferatu (1922), which differs somewhat from Stoker's original work. The makers of the earlier film changed several minor details and character names. They also did not have permission to use the intellectual property of the novel, which was owned (at the time) by Stoker's widow Florence. A lawsuit was filed, resulting in an order for the destruction of all prints of the film. Some prints survived and were restored after Florence Stoker had died and the copyright had expired. By the 1960s and early 1970s the original silent returned to circulation, and was enjoyed by a new generation of moviegoers.

Herzog considered Murnau's Nosferatu to be the greatest film ever to come out of Germany, and was eager to make his own version of the film, with Klaus Kinski in the leading role. In 1979, by the very day the copyright for Dracula had entered the public domain, Herzog proceeded with his updated version of the classic German film, which could now include the original character names.

Herzog saw his film as a parable about the fragility of order in a staid, bourgeois town. "It is more than a horror film," he says. "Nosferatu is not a monster, but an ambivalent, masterful force of change. When the plague threatens, people throw their property into the streets; they discard their bourgeois trappings. A re‐evaluation of life and its meaning takes place." Adjani said about her heroine: "There's a sexual element. She is gradually attracted towards Nosferatu. She feels a fascination — as we all would think. First, she hopes to save the people of the town by sacrificing herself. But then, there is a moment of transition. There is a scene when he is sucking her blood — sucking and sucking like an animal—and suddenly, her face takes on a new expression, a sexual one, and she will not let him go away anymore. There is a desire that has been born. A moment like this has never been seen in a vampire picture". According to Kinski: "We see Dracula sympathetically [in this film]. He is a man without free will. He cannot choose, and he cannot cease to be. He is a kind of incarnation of evil, but he is also a man who is suffering, suffering for love. This makes it so much more dramatic, more double‐edged."

Filming

Nosferatu the Vampyre was co-produced by Werner Herzog Filmproduktion, French film company Gaumont, and West German public-service television station ZDF. As was common for West German films during the 1970s, Nosferatu the Vampyre was filmed on a minimal budget and with a crew of just 16 people. Herzog could not film in Wismar, where the original Murnau film was shot, so he relocated production to Delft, Netherlands. Parts of the film were shot in nearby Schiedam, after the Delft authorities refused to allow Herzog to release 11,000 rats for a scene in the film. Dracula's home is represented by locations in Czechoslovakia. Herzog originally intended to film in Transylvania, but Nicolae Ceaușescu's regime would not allow it due to the relation between the character of count Dracula and Vlad the Impaler. Pernštejn Castle stands in for castle Dracula in the film, both interiors and exteriors.

At the request of distributor 20th Century Fox, Herzog produced two versions of the film simultaneously to appeal to English-speaking audiences. Most of the scenes with dialogue were filmed twice, once in German and again in English, although a few scenes were shot once with dubbing used as needed. In 2014, Herzog called the German version the "more authentic" version of the two.

Herzog himself filmed the opening sequence at the Mummies of Guanajuato museum in Guanajuato, Mexico, where a large number of naturally mummified bodies of the victims of an 1833 cholera epidemic are on public display. Herzog had first seen the Guanajuato mummies while visiting in the 1960s. On his return in the 1970s, he took the corpses out of the glass cases they normally store. He propped them against a wall to film them, arranging them in a sequence running roughly from childhood to old age.

Kinski's Dracula make-up, with black costume, bald head, rat-like teeth, and long fingernails, is an imitation of Max Schreck's makeup in the 1922 original. The makeup artist who worked on Kinski was the Japanese artist Reiko Kruk. Although he fought with Herzog and others during the making of other films, Kinski got along with Kruk, and the four-hour makeup sessions went on with no outbursts from Kinski himself. Several shots in the movie are faithful recreations of iconic images from Murnau's original film, some almost perfectly identical to their counterparts, intended as homages to Murnau.

Music

The film score to Nosferatu the Vampyre was composed by the West German group Popol Vuh, who have collaborated with Herzog on numerous projects. Music for the film comprises material from the group's album Brüder des Schattens – Söhne des Lichts. Additionally, the film features Richard Wagner's prelude to Das Rheingold, Charles Gounod's "Sanctus" from Messe solennelle à Sainte Cécile and traditional Georgian folk song "Tsintskaro", sung by Vocal Ensemble Gordela.

Animal cruelty
Dutch behavioral biologist Maarten 't Hart, hired by Herzog for his expertise with laboratory rats, revealed that, after witnessing the inhumane way in which the rats were treated, he no longer wished to cooperate. Apart from traveling conditions that were so poor that the rats, imported from Hungary, had started to eat each other upon arrival in the Netherlands, Herzog insisted the plain white rats be dyed gray. To do so, according to 't Hart, the cages containing the rats needed to be submerged in boiling water for several seconds, causing another half of them to die. The surviving rats proceeded to lick themselves clean of the dye immediately, as 't Hart had predicted they would. 't Hart also implied sheep and horses that appear in the movie were treated very poorly but did not specify this any further.

Release
Released as Nosferatu: Phantom der Nacht in German and Nosferatu the Vampyre in English, the film was entered into the 29th Berlin International Film Festival, where production designer Henning von Gierke won the Silver Bear for an outstanding single achievement.

Critical response

Film review aggregator Rotten Tomatoes reports a 95% approval critic response based on 54 reviews, with an average rating of 8.2/10. The website's critical consensus states: "Stunning visuals from Werner Herzog and an intense portrayal of the famed bloodsucker from Klaus Kinski make this remake of Nosferatu a horror classic in its own right."

In contemporary reviews, the film is noted for maintaining an element of horror, with numerous deaths and a grim atmosphere. Still, it features a more expanded plot than many Dracula productions, with a greater emphasis on the vampire's tragic loneliness. Dracula is still a ghastly figure, but with a greater sense of pathos; weary, unloved, and doomed to immortality. Reviewer John J. Puccio of MovieMet considers it a faithful homage to Murnau's original film, significantly updating the original material and avoiding the danger of being overly derivative.

Roger Ebert of The Chicago Sun-Times reviewed the film upon its 1979 release, giving it four stars out of a possible four, writing: "There is nothing pleasant about Herzog's vampire", which was "played totally without ego by Klaus Kinski". Ebert added, "This movie isn't even scary. It's so slow it's meditative at times, but it is the most evocative series of images centered around the idea of the vampire that I have ever seen since F.W. Murnau's Nosferatu, which was made in 1922." In 2011 Ebert added the film to his "Great Movies Collection." Concluding his review, Ebert said:
One striking quality of the film is its beauty. Herzog's pictorial eye is not often enough credited. His films always upstage it with their themes. We are focused on what happens, and there are few 'beauty shots.' Look here at his control of the color palette, his off-center compositions, of the dramatic counterpoint of light and dark. Here is a film that does honor to the seriousness of vampires. No, I don't believe in them. But if they were real, here is how they must look.

See also
 Gothic film
 Vampire films

References

External links
 
 

Nosferatu
1979 films
1979 horror films
Dracula films
1970s English-language films
Films based on adaptations
Films directed by Werner Herzog
Films set in Germany
Films set in the 1850s
Films set in the 19th century
Films scored by Popol Vuh (band)
Films shot in Mexico
Films shot in Slovakia
Films shot in the Czech Republic
Delft
Films set in Transylvania
French horror films
Films set in castles
Remakes of German films
German horror films
1970s German-language films
German vampire films
Gaumont Film Company films
Horror film remakes
Period horror films
Roland Topor
1970s Romanian-language films
Silver Bear for outstanding artistic contribution
Sound film remakes of silent films
West German films
1979 multilingual films
German multilingual films
1970s French films
1970s German films